GAGRANA is a village in Nagaur District in Rajasthan State in India. It is located on the Ajmer-Nagaur Road, east of Merta City.

Villages in Nagaur district